Paulla Dove Jennings is a Narragansett storyteller, educator, and children's book author.

Background 
Paulla Dove Jennings was born in 1940 in Providence, Rhode Island. Her parents are Eleanor and Ferris Dove, and her family is Narragansett with Niantic ancestry. Jennings is an enrolled member of the Narragansett Indian Tribe and belongs to the Turtle Clan.

Jennings' father was a Narragansett war chief and graduated from Bacone College. He and his wife ran a popular restaurant and trading post for many years called Dovecrest. The site later became a school teaching a curriculum of Native American history and values. Jennings was one of four children, she learned her tribal and family history from her grandmother.

Career 
Jennings also obtained a degree from the Community College of Rhode Island and has worked as a curator for both the Boston Children's Museum and the Tomaquag Indian Memorial Museum in Exeter, Rhode Island. She has performed as a storyteller at the National Museum of the American Indian in Washington, D.C. In 2010, Jennings served as the Tribal Historian in Residence for the certificate program in Native American Studies at the UMASS Amherst.

In addition to her work as an educator and storyteller, Jennings has been politically active in her tribe. She has served on her tribal council, and in 2007 ran an unsuccessful campaign for the position of chief sachem. She and her son Adam were among the plaintiffs in a lawsuit against Rhode Island State Police, which in July 2003 raided a tribal smoke shop. The raid resulted in eight arrests and eight injured, including Jennings's son. Jennings herself has spoken publicly about the case as an infringement on Narragansett tribal sovereignty.

Strawberry Thanksgiving 
Strawberry Thanksgiving was written for the Multicultural Celebrations at the Boston Children's Museum, part of a series of books designed to educate children about different cultures. Written by Jennings and illustrated by Ramona Peters, the book tells how a young boy, Adam, learns to forgive his sister by hearing his grandmother tell the story of Strawberry Thanksgiving.

References

External links 
 Official website of the Narragansett tribe
 Boston Children's Museum
 Tomaquag Indian Memorial Museum
 2010 video of Jennings speaking at the University of Rhode Island
 2013 video of Jennings speaking at the Tomaquag Indian Memorial Museum

Living people
1940 births
21st-century American women writers
American storytellers
American women children's writers
Community College of Rhode Island alumni
Narragansett people
Native American women writers
Native American curators
People from Providence, Rhode Island
Women storytellers
Writers from Rhode Island
21st-century Native American women
21st-century Native Americans